Bhagwat Dayal Sharma (26 January 1918 – 22 February 1993), popularly known as Panditji, was the first Chief Minister of the Indian state of Haryana and later Governor of Odisha and Madhya Pradesh from 30 April 1980 to 14 May 1984. He is one of the greatest leaders of Haryana and his legacy is celebrated even today.

Personal life 
He was born in Beri, a town in the Jhajjar district of Haryana on 26January 1918. Bansi Lal, Bhajan Lal and many other noted politicians learned politics under his guidance.

He married Savitri Devi and they had six children; three sons and three daughters. He was educated at Banaras Hindu University, Banaras. His eldest son Sh. Rajesh Sharma became Sports Minister of Haryana and Deputy Chairman of the State's Planning Board. After his wife Savitri's death, Panditji built "Savitri Nikunj", in her memory, an exotic garden with indigenous and rare plants and trees at Raj Bhawan in Bhopal.

Independence movement and political career

 Participated in the freedom struggle from 1941 to 1947
 Sentenced to jail for 1 year in 1941
 Sentenced to jail for 3.5 years in 1942
 Member of Indian labourers delegation to ILO (Geneva) in 1957 and 1958
 All-India Trade Union Congress (Punjab HP, J & K) Secretary and President in 1959-61
 Member of Punjab Legislative Assembly and Minister of State for Labour and Cooperatives from 1962 to 1966

Sharma became Chief Minister of Haryana on 1November 1966 then resigned to be replaced by Rao Birender Singh on 24March 1967.

 Rajya Sabha member from 1968 to 1974
 All India congress Working Committee member from 1970 to 1972

Appointed Governor of Odisha in 1977, during his time in the state, he became patron of many social and cultural institutions. To develop tourism in Odisha, he suggested that the summer Raj Bhavan at Puri should be converted to a high class hotel for international tourists with facilities for golf, swimming and tennis as well as a large hall for holding conferences. The Indian Tourist Development Corporation (ITDC) was subsequently asked to take up the venture. Sharma was also actively involved in the administrative committee of the Hindu Jagannath temple in Puri.
He decided to side with the syndicate after the expulsion of Indira Gandhi from the Congress.
He subsequently transferred to Madhya Pradesh since the Odisha climate did not suit his health.

During his career, Panditji travelled to Switzerland, the UK, the USSR, Germany, USA, and a number of other European countries.

Death
He died on 22 February 1993 because of gradual declining health and old age. Huge numbers of people from all over world attended his funeral. His cremation took place at Beri (the village, he was born at), Jhajjar, Haryana. A tomb place has been built at the site of his cremation in Beri.

Honors
Pandit Bhagwat Dayal Sharma University of Health Sciences, Rohtak named after him incorporates Pandit Bhagwat Dayal Sharma Post Graduate Institute of Medical Sciences.

References

1918 births
1992 deaths
People from Sonipat
Chief Ministers of Haryana
Governors of Odisha
Governors of Madhya Pradesh
Place of birth missing
People from Jhajjar district
Punjab, India MLAs 1962–1967
Haryana MLAs 1966–1967
Chief ministers from Indian National Congress
Indian National Congress politicians
Indian National Congress (Organisation) politicians